Léo Battesti (born 6 November 1953) is a Corsican politician, journalist, and chess enthusiast.

Political career
He was born in Bastia. He earned a Master of Law at Université Paris-Sorbonne. He served as General Secretary of Corsican Students (CSC), 1976–78, in Nice. He was imprisoned from 1978 to 1981, following his commitment to Corsican nationalism. He was amnestied in 1981 by President François Mitterrand.

He worked as a journalist from 1981 to 1992, chief Editor of a Corsican weekly.

He was elected to the Corsican Assembly from 1986 to 1992 and was vice-president of the Culture and Sports Commission from 1990 to 1992. He was also Bastia town council member from 1988 to 1992.

Chess
He is vice-president of French Chess Federation since January 2005, in charge of communication and thus, chief-editor of the quarterly “Échec & Mat”.

Candidate for President of the French Chess Federation  (March 2013 election)

On 16 June 2012, Mr. Battesti Vice President of the FFE is applying his bid to the election of the Presidency of the French Chess Federation.
This bid sparks debate on one side with a certain enthusiasm from aficionados who are amazed by the spectacular success of chess in Corsica.
Whose dithyrambic échecsinfos.com
And on the other side, measured circumspection, which worries about a democratic deficit for some time in the organs of the FFE directional.
With for example the blog of Christophe Bouton: échecs 64.
A decision also shows the extreme delicacy of Mr. Leonard Battesti regarding conflict resolution has been given in the last international open chess Corsica in 2011 and led to the exclusion of Iranian player; Ghaem Maghami that refused to play against an Israeli player ...
A summary of the event at chess vibes.
And a comment bittersweet by Steve Giddin on his chess blog.

References

1953 births
University of Paris alumni
People from Bastia
Members of the Corsican Assembly
Corsican nationalists
French chess players
Living people
Chess officials